Obeng Tabi Amponsah (born October 28, 2000) is a Canadian professional soccer player.

Early life
He played youth soccer with FS Salaberry. In 2019, he played in the U21 LSEQ with CS St-Laurent. In 2021, he played at the senior amateur level in the LSEQ with CS Étoiles de l'Est.

College career
Tabi played college soccer at the junior college level for Louisiana State University Eunice in 2020 and 2021. In 2021, as a sophomore, he was named an NJCAA Third Team All-American, after contributing three assists in 14 starts with LSU Eunice.

Club career 
In January 2022, he signed a deal with HFX Wanderers FC of the Canadian Premier League. He made his professional debut in the Wanderers' first game of the season against York United, making an impact by preventing a clear scoring chance from York at the end of the first half. At the end of the season, HFX declined Tabi's contract option for the 2023 season.

International career
In December 2022, he was called up to a camp with the Canada national futsal team.

References

External links

2000 births
Living people
Association football defenders
Black Canadian soccer players
HFX Wanderers FC players
Canadian Premier League players
Canadian soccer players
Louisiana State University at Eunice
Soccer people from Quebec
Sportspeople from Laval, Quebec
Canadian expatriate sportspeople in the United States
Expatriate soccer players in the United States
Canadian expatriate soccer players